Lindsey Adams Buckingham (born October 3, 1949) is an American musician and record producer, best known as the lead guitarist and co-lead vocalist of the band Fleetwood Mac from 1975 to 1987 and 1997 to 2018. In addition to his tenure with Fleetwood Mac, Buckingham has released seven solo studio albums and three live albums. As a member of Fleetwood Mac, he was inducted into the Rock and Roll Hall of Fame in 1998. Buckingham was ranked 100th in Rolling Stones 2011 list of "The 100 Greatest Guitarists of All Time". Buckingham is known for his fingerpicking guitar style.

Fleetwood Mac, the band that gave Buckingham his greatest exposure, had been around since the late 1960s, beginning as a British blues outfit led by Peter Green. After Green left the band, they experienced several tumultuous years without a stable frontman. Buckingham was invited to join the band in 1974; they had recorded in the same studio, and the band was lacking a guitarist and male lead vocalist. As a stipulation to joining, Buckingham insisted his musical and romantic partner Stevie Nicks also be included. Buckingham and Nicks became the face of Fleetwood Mac during its most commercially successful period, highlighted by the multi-platinum studio album Rumours (1977), which sold over 40 million copies worldwide. Though highly successful, the group experienced almost constant creative and personal conflict, and Buckingham left the band in 1987 to focus on his solo career. Hit songs Buckingham wrote and sang with Fleetwood Mac include "Go Your Own Way", "Never Going Back Again", "Tusk", and "Big Love".

A one-off reunion at the 1993 inauguration ball for President Bill Clinton initiated some rapprochement between the former band members, with Buckingham performing some vocals on one track of their 1995 studio album Time, and rejoining the band full-time in 1997 for the live tour and album The Dance. On April 9, 2018, Buckingham was fired from Fleetwood Mac and replaced by Mike Campbell and Neil Finn.

Early life
Lindsey Adams Buckingham was born on October 3, 1949, in Palo Alto, California, to Rutheda (née Elliott) and Morris Buckingham. He had two older brothers, Jeffrey and Gregory. Growing up in the San Francisco Bay Area community of Atherton, he attended Menlo-Atherton High School where Buckingham and his brothers were encouraged to swim competitively. Though Buckingham dropped out of athletics to pursue music, his brother Gregory went on to win a silver medal at the 1968 Olympics in Mexico City. Buckingham attended San José State University, but did not graduate.

Buckingham's first forays into guitar playing took place on a toy Mickey Mouse guitar, playing along to his brother Jeff's extensive collection of 45s. Noticing his talent, Buckingham's parents bought their son a $35 Harmony guitar.

Buckingham never took guitar lessons and does not read music. By age 13, he became interested in folk music and, influenced by banjo methods, practiced the energetic style of the Kingston Trio.

Music career
From 1966 to 1971, Buckingham performed psychedelic and folk rock with the high school rock band originally named the Fritz Rabyne Memorial Band as a bassist and vocalist. The band regrouped in 1967 due to band member changes and shortened their name to Fritz. Buckingham invited friend Stevie Nicks to join Fritz as a backing vocalist. Their romantic relationship began after both left Fritz five years later.

1973–1974: Buckingham Nicks
Buckingham and his then-girlfriend Stevie Nicks recorded seven demos in 1972 on a half-inch 4-track Ampex recorder kept at his father's coffee roasting plant in Daly City, then drove to Los Angeles to pursue a recording contract. In 1973, Polydor Records signed the pair. Their studio album, produced by Keith Olsen and second engineer Richard Dashut, Buckingham Nicks, was released in September 1973; however, soon after its release Polydor dropped the duo because of poor sales. To help make ends meet, Buckingham toured with Don Everly's backing band, singing Phil Everly's parts.

1975–1980: Fleetwood Mac and mainstream success

While investigating Sound City recording studio in California, Mick Fleetwood heard the song "Frozen Love" from the Buckingham Nicks studio album. Impressed, he asked who the guitarist was. By chance, Buckingham and Nicks were also in Sound City recording demos, and Buckingham and Fleetwood were introduced. When Bob Welch left Fleetwood Mac in December 1974, Fleetwood immediately contacted Buckingham and offered him the vacant guitar slot in his band. Buckingham told Fleetwood that he and Nicks were a team and that he didn't want to work without her. Fleetwood agreed to hire both of them, without an audition. Buckingham and Nicks then began a short tour to promote the Buckingham Nicks album. The touring band included drummers Bob Aguirre and Gary Hodges (playing simultaneously) and bassist Tom Moncrieff, who later played bass on Nicks' debut solo studio album Bella Donna (1981). When they played in Alabama, the one area where they saw appreciable sales, they told their fans they had joined Fleetwood Mac.

Fleetwood Mac released their eponymously titled studio album in 1975, which reached number one on the American charts. Buckingham contributed two songs to the album, "Monday Morning" and "I'm So Afraid", while also singing lead on "Blue Letter" and Nicks' song "Crystal". "I'm So Afraid" and "Monday Morning" were intended for the planned follow-up Buckingham Nicks studio album, but they were instead used with Fleetwood Mac.

Despite the success of the new line-up's first studio album, it was their second studio album together, Rumours (1977), that propelled the band to superstar status, becoming one of the best-selling studio albums of all time. Buckingham's "Go Your Own Way" was the lead single, soaring into the US Top Ten; also on the album were Buckingham's "Second Hand News" and "Never Going Back Again". Buckingham also sang co-lead vocal on two of the band's biggest live staples: "The Chain", written by the entire band, and "Don't Stop", a Christine McVie number.

After the resounding commercial success of Rumours (during the making of which Buckingham and Nicks broke up), Buckingham was determined to avoid falling into repeating the same musical pattern. The result was Tusk (1979), a double studio album that Buckingham primarily directed. Once again, Buckingham wrote the lead single, the title track that peaked at No. 8 on the Billboard Hot 100. Buckingham convinced Fleetwood to let his work on their next studio album be more experimental and to be allowed to work on tracks at home before bringing them to the rest of the band in the studio. It produced three hit singles: Lindsey Buckingham's "Tusk" (US No. 8), which featured the USC Trojan Marching Band, Christine McVie's "Think About Me" (US No. 20), and Stevie Nicks' 6½-minute opus "Sara" (US No. 7). "Sara" was cut to 4½ minutes for both the hit single and the first CD-release of the album, but the unedited version has since been restored on the 1988 greatest hits compilation, the 2004 reissue of Tusk  and Fleetwood Mac's 2002 release of The Very Best of Fleetwood Mac. Original guitarist Peter Green also took part in the sessions of Tusk, although his playing on the Christine McVie track "Brown Eyes" is not credited on the album. It was during this time that Buckingham moved in with record company secretary and aspiring model Carol Ann Harris, with whom he lived until 1984. Though by most standards a hit, Tusk failed to come close to Rumours'''s record sales, and the album was followed by a hiatus in the band's studio recording efforts.

1981: Going solo and Law and Order
During the time he worked on Tusk, Buckingham also produced studio albums for Walter Egan and John Stewart in the late 1970s as well as beginning work on his own solo studio album.

In 1981, Buckingham released his debut solo studio album, Law and Order, playing nearly every instrument and featuring guest appearances by bandmates Mick Fleetwood and Christine McVie. The album pursued the quirky, eclectic, often lo-fi and new wave influences of Tusk and spawned the single "Trouble" (inspired by Fleetwood Mac producer Richard Dashut), which reached No. 9 on the Billboard Hot 100 and No. 1 in Australia (for three weeks).

1982: Mirage
After a large world tour that ended in 1980, Fleetwood Mac took a year-long break before reconvening to record their next studio album Mirage (1982), a more pop-friendly work that returned the band to the top of the US album chart. However, by this time various members of the band were enjoying success as solo artists (particularly Nicks) and the next Fleetwood Mac album was not released until five years later.

1983–1986: Go Insane and other solo projects
In 1983 he wrote and performed the songs "Holiday Road" and "Dancin' Across the USA" for the film National Lampoon's Vacation. "Holiday Road" was released as a single, and reached No. 82 on Billboards Hot 100.

In 1984, after ending his 7-year relationship with Carol Ann Harris, he released his second solo studio album, Go Insane. The title track was a modest hit, reaching No. 23 on the Hot 100. In 2008, he revealed the title track was about his post-breakup relationship with Stevie Nicks; however, Harris claimed in her memoir Storms that the song was written about her breakup with Buckingham. The last track of the album, "D. W. Suite", was a tribute to the late Beach Boys drummer Dennis Wilson, a close friend of Fleetwood Mac who was briefly engaged to Christine McVie. Also that year, Buckingham played guitars and sang harmony vocals on the track "You Can't Make Love" from Don Henley's second solo studio album Building the Perfect Beast.

The next year, Buckingham performed on USA for Africa's fundraising single, "We Are the World". In 1986 he co-wrote "Since You've Gone" for Belinda Carlisle's debut solo studio album, Belinda. He did other soundtrack work, including the song "Time Bomb Town" from Back to the Future (1985). Buckingham played all of the instruments on the track except drums, which were played by Michael Huey.

1987: Tango In the Night and departure from Fleetwood Mac
Buckingham’s fifth studio album with Fleetwood Mac, Tango in the Night, was released in 1987. Buckingham had already released two solo studio albums and had given up much of the material for what would have been his third solo studio album for the project, including "Big Love", "Tango in the Night ", "Family Man", "You and I" and "Caroline". "Big Love", released as the first single from the album, became a top ten hit in the US and the UK.

Propelled by a string of hit singles, Tango in the Night became the band's biggest studio album since Rumours a decade earlier. However, following its release, Buckingham left Fleetwood Mac largely because of his desire not to tour and the strain he was feeling within the band. "I needed to get some separation from Stevie especially because I don't think I'd ever quite gotten closure on our relationship," he said. "I needed to get on with the next phase of my creative growth and my emotional growth. When you break up with someone and then for the next 10 years you have to be around them and do for them and watch them move away from you, it's not easy." Fleetwood Mac continued without him, and Buckingham was replaced by two guitarists, Rick Vito and Billy Burnette.

1988–1992: Out of the Cradle
Following his departure from Fleetwood Mac in 1987, Buckingham spent much of the next five years in the studio, working on his third solo studio album, Out of the Cradle, which was released in 1992. Many of the songs deal with his relationship with Nicks and his decision to leave the band. "There were things lingering for years having to do with relationships and the band, hurtful things, that were impossible to deal with until I left. If you were in a relationship and split up, then had to see that person every day for the next 15 years, it might keep you from dealing with some of those things. While we made Rumours (in 1977) there were two couples breaking up in the band (Buckingham and Nicks, and John and Christine McVie), and we had to say, 'This is an important thing we're doing, so we've got to put this set of feelings on this side of the room and get on with it.' And when you do that long enough you forget that those feelings are even there. On this album, I'm putting all these feelings in the healthiest possible perspective and that, looking at it broadly, is a lot of what the album is dealing with. It's a catharsis, absolutely." "Wrong" was a gentle rebuke of former bandmate Mick Fleetwood's tell-all biography, published in 1990. Out of the Cradle received some favorable reviews but did not achieve the sales levels associated with Fleetwood Mac. However, Buckingham toured throughout 1992–93 for the first time as a solo artist; his band included an army of seven other guitarists (Buckingham himself calls them "the crazy band" on his Soundstage DVD), each of whom he individually taught the entire two-and-a-half hours of music from the concert (Lindsey Buckingham: Behind the Music documentary for VH1, 2001).

1993–2004: Return to Fleetwood Mac

In 1993, newly elected president Bill Clinton asked Fleetwood Mac to come together to perform the song he had chosen for his campaign, the Christine McVie-penned "Don't Stop", at his inauguration on January 20, 1993. Buckingham agreed to be part of the performance, but the experience was something of a one-off for the band, who were still very much at odds with one another and had no plans to reunite officially.

While assembling material for a planned fourth solo studio album in the mid-1990s, Buckingham contacted Mick Fleetwood for assistance on a song. Their collaboration lasted much longer than anticipated, and the two eventually decided to call upon Stevie Nicks, John and Christine McVie. In 1997, Buckingham and all four of his bandmates from the Rumours-era line-up of Fleetwood Mac went on the road for the first time together since 1982 in a reunion tour titled The Dance. The tour was hugely successful and did much to heal the damage that had been done between Buckingham and his bandmates. However, Christine McVie left the band in 1998 because of her fear of flying and to be with her family in the UK, thus making the band a foursome.

A subsequent fourth solo studio album, titled Gift of Screws, was recorded between 1995–2001 and presented to Warner Bros. and Reprise for release. Executives at the label managed to persuade Buckingham to hold the album back and instead take several tracks from Gift of Screws and use them with Fleetwood Mac. In 2003, the reformed band released the first studio album involving Buckingham and Nicks in 15 years, Say You Will. Buckingham's song "Peacekeeper" was the first single from the album, and the band went on a world concert tour that lasted almost a year and a half. Seven songs from Gift of Screws appear on the Fleetwood Mac studio album Say You Will, in substantially the same form as Buckingham had recorded them for his solo release. Bootleg copies of Gift of Screws—taken from an original CD-R presented to Warner Bros and Reprise—are known to exist and have been widely distributed among fans through the use of torrent sites and other peer-to-peer networks.

2006–2008: Continuing solo
On his 57th birthday, October 3, 2006, Buckingham's fourth solo studio album, an acoustic album now titled Under the Skin, was released.  Under the Skin features Buckingham on almost all instruments, with the exception of two tracks that feature Fleetwood Mac's rhythm section of John McVie and Mick Fleetwood. The album includes a cover of the Rolling Stones classic "I Am Waiting".  Three days after the album's release, Buckingham embarked on a tour in support of the album that lasted until the end of June 2007. A live album and DVD, Live at the Bass Performance Hall, was released documenting the Fort Worth, Texas show from this tour.

In 2008 the Gift of Screws album was finally released, containing three tracks from the originally planned studio album, as well as seven new recordings. Buckingham then commenced a short tour to promote Gift of Screws in September and October, opening in Saratoga, California and closing in New York City.

2009: Unleashed Tour
Fleetwood Mac toured in 2009, with the first date of the "UNLEASHED" Tour as March 1, 2009, in Mellon Arena (Pittsburgh). Christine McVie was not involved with this project.

2010–2012: Seeds We Sow and One Man Show
On November 3, 2010, Buckingham's website announced that he was working on an untitled studio album with release planned in early 2011. Buckingham had finished recording the studio album, titled Seeds We Sow in April, and on April 22, 2011, he filmed a concert for DVD release to support the album. Seeds We Sow was released on September 6, 2011. On September 10, Buckingham kicked off the Seeds We Sow Tour in Reno, Nevada; the tour ended in Tulsa, Oklahoma, on November 14. Buckingham had planned to conduct his first solo tour of the United Kingdom and Ireland in December. However, in early December, Buckingham postponed all UK dates due to his guitarist suffering a back injury. The UK dates were subsequently cancelled.
Buckingham began a "solo" (no backing band) tour of the United States on May 3, 2012, in Solana Beach, California and in November 2012 released a completely solo live album One Man Show via digital download at iTunes that was recorded from a single night in Des Moines, Iowa. One Man Show was released on Buckingham's own label Buckingham Records LLC.

2013–2015: Fleetwood Mac EP, world tour and Christine McVie reunion
The "Live World" tour commenced on April 4, 2013, in Columbus, Ohio. On April 30, the band released their first new studio material since 2003's Say You Will via digital download on iTunes with the four-track EP containing three new songs from Buckingham and one new song from the Buckingham Nicks sessions ("Without You").
Buckingham is credited for three songs on the 2013 release Hesitation Marks, the eighth studio album of the band Nine Inch Nails.

On January 11, 2014, Mick Fleetwood announced that Christine McVie was rejoining Fleetwood Mac, and the news was confirmed on January 13 by the band's primary publicist, Liz Rosenberg. Rosenberg also stated that an official announcement regarding a new album and tour was forthcoming.

On with the Show, a 33-city North American Tour opened in Minneapolis, Minnesota on September 30, 2014. A series of May–June 2015 arena dates in the United Kingdom went on sale on November 14, selling out in minutes. Additional dates for the tour were added, extending into November.

In January 2015, Buckingham suggested that the new studio album and the new tour might be Fleetwood Mac's last act and that the band would cease to operate in 2015 or soon afterward. He concluded: "We're going to continue working on the new album, and the solo stuff will take a back seat for a year or two. A beautiful way to wrap up this last act". On the other hand, Mick Fleetwood stated that the new studio album could take a few years to complete and that they were waiting for contributions from Stevie Nicks, who had been ambivalent about committing to a new record.

2016–2017: Lindsey Buckingham Christine McVie and Classic Concerts
In August 2016, Fleetwood said that while the band has "a huge amount of recorded music", virtually none of it features Stevie Nicks. Buckingham and Christine McVie, however, had contributed multiple songs to the new project. Fleetwood told Ultimate Classic Rock, "She [McVie] ... wrote up a storm ... She and Lindsey could probably have a mighty strong duet album if they want. In truth, I hope it will come to more than that. There really are dozens of songs. And they're really good. So we'll see."

Buckingham and Christine McVie announced a collaborative studio album titled Lindsey Buckingham Christine McVie, which also features Mick Fleetwood and John McVie. The album was originally planned as a Fleetwood Mac album. Stevie Nicks did not participate due to her preference for a solo tour with the Pretenders. Lindsey Buckingham/Christine McVie was released on June 9, 2017, and was preceded by the single, "In My World". A 38-date tour began on June 21, 2017, and ended on November 16.

2018–present: Firing from Fleetwood Mac, Solo Anthology, and Lindsey Buckingham
Following Fleetwood Mac's performance at the MusiCares Person of the Year in January 2018, Buckingham was fired from the band. The reason was said to have been a disagreement about the nature of the tour, and in particular the question of whether newer or less well-known material would be included, as Buckingham wanted.

Mick Fleetwood and the band appeared on CBS This Morning on April 25, 2018, and said that Buckingham would not sign off on a tour that the group had been planning for a year and that they had reached a "huge impasse" and "hit a brick wall". When asked if Buckingham had been fired, he said, "Well, we don't use that word because I think it's ugly." He also said that "Lindsey has huge amounts of respect and kudos to what he's done within the ranks of Fleetwood Mac and always will." In October 2018, Buckingham filed a lawsuit against Fleetwood Mac for breach of fiduciary duty, breach of oral contract and intentional interference with prospective economic advantage, among other charges; the lawsuit was settled in December of the same year.

Buckingham stated he learned about the firing after receiving a call from Fleetwood Mac manager Irving Azoff with a message for Buckingham from Stevie Nicks. Buckingham stated that Azoff told him: "Stevie never wants to be on a stage with you again." According to Azoff, Nicks had taken issue with, on the evening of MusicCares, the guitarist's outburst just before the band's set over the intro music—the studio recording of Nicks' "Rhiannon"—and the way he "smirked" during Nicks' thank-you speech. Buckingham conceded that "It wasn't about it being 'Rhiannon'. It just undermined the impact of our entrance. That's me being very specific about the right and wrong way to do something." Days later, Buckingham called Azoff and asked, "Is Stevie leaving the band, or am I getting kicked out?" Azoff told him that he was "getting ousted" from the band after Nicks gave the other band members "an ultimatum: Either [Buckingham] go[es] or she's going to go," to which they decided to fire him. Former Tom Petty and the Heartbreakers guitarist Mike Campbell and Neil Finn of Crowded House were named to replace Buckingham. Buckingham has stated since that he would be open to rejoining Fleetwood Mac but does not foresee it in the future.

In August 2018, Reprise issued a press release for a new solo anthology Solo Anthology: The Best of Lindsey Buckingham that focused on Buckingham's solo career since 1981. The anthology was released on October 5, 2018, followed two days later by a solo tour throughout North America. In 2020, Buckingham collaborated with the Killers on their studio album Imploding the Mirage, playing guitar on the first single "Caution". In 2021, Buckingham played on a new version of "The Past Is the Past" by Brandy Clark, issued as a bonus track on the deluxe edition of her album Your Life Is a Record.

On June 8, 2021, Buckingham announced his seventh solo studio album, Lindsey Buckingham, with the single "I Don’t Mind". The second single from the album, "On the Wrong Side", was released on July 23, 2021. The record was released on September 17, 2021, and his tour to support it started the same month.

Buckingham also guested on Halsey's 2021 studio album If I Can't Have Love, I Want Power. In 2022, Buckingham would again join with the Killers on August 27, 2022 to perform his guitar solo from "Caution" live on stage in Los Angeles with the band, along with a cover of Fleetwood Mac's "Go Your Own Way". Buckingham along with the Killers were joined with Johnny Marr of the Smiths to perform "Mr. Brightside" together to close out the concert.

Personal life
Buckingham was in the same high school as Stevie Nicks but a year behind her. He started a relationship with Nicks after the breakup of their band Fritz. He then suffered from a bout of mononucleosis, which delayed their move to Los Angeles in 1971. They recorded a studio album together before joining Fleetwood Mac in 1975, while their relationship had broken down by 1977. The breakup was chronicled in a number of songs written by the two, such as "Silver Springs" and "Dreams" by Nicks and "Go Your Own Way" and "Second Hand News" by Buckingham.

Buckingham had his first child, William Gregory, with Kristen Messner on July 8, 1998. Buckingham then married Messner in 2000, and they had two daughters, Leelee in 2000 and Stella in 2004. Buckingham and Messner, who is a photographer and interior designer, have developed homes in Brentwood, California.

Buckingham underwent emergency open heart surgery in February 2019. His wife Kristen said that "the life-saving procedure caused vocal cord damage, the permanency of which is unclear. Lindsey is slowly recovering at home with the support of his wife and children."

Kristen Messner filed for divorce from Buckingham in Los Angeles on June 2, 2021. It was reported later in September that the couple were working on their marriage.

Musical style
Unlike most rock guitarists, Buckingham does not play with a pick; instead, he picks the strings with his fingers and fingernails and tends to strum with his middle and ring fingers. Initially after joining Fleetwood Mac, Buckingham used a Gibson Les Paul Custom. Before the band, a Fender Telecaster was his main guitar, and was used on his first Fleetwood Mac studio album alongside Fender Stratocasters fitted with an Alembic Blaster. In 1978, he worked with Rick Turner, future owner and founder of The Renaissance Guitar Company, to create the Model One guitar. He has used it extensively since, both with Fleetwood Mac and for his solo efforts. He uses a Taylor Guitar 814ce or a Rick Turner Renaissance RS6 for most of his acoustic performances but uses a custom-made Gibson Chet Atkins guitar for his live performances of "Big Love". He has also used an Ovation Balladeer in the past from the early 1970s to the late 1980s. In the 1980s, he also extensively used the Fairlight CMI sampling synthesizer.

His influences include Brian Wilson and Phil Spector. Buckingham has also worked extensively as a producer both for Fleetwood Mac and for his solo work. "I think of myself as a stylist, and the process of writing a song is part and parcel with putting it together in the studio."

In an interview with Guitar World Acoustic Magazine, Buckingham said:

I've always believed that you play to highlight the song, not to highlight the player. The song is all that matters. There are two ways you can choose to go. You can try to be someone like Eddie Van Halen, who is a great guitarist, a virtuoso. Yet he doesn't make good records because what he plays is totally lost in the context of this band's music. Then there are guitar players like Chet Atkins, who weren't out there trying to show themselves off as guitarists per se, but were using the guitar as a tool to make good records. I remember loving Chet's work when I was a kid, but it was only later, when I really listened to his guitar parts, that I realized how much they were a part of the song's fabric, and how much you'd be going 'Oh, that song just isn't working' if they weren't there.

In another interview to Guitar World, he said about using his fingers rather than a plectrum:

I started playing very young and from early on, the people I was listening to had some element of finger style. Probably the first guitarist I was emulating was Scotty Moore, when I was maybe 6 or 7. And he played with a pick, but he also used fingers. And a lot of the session players, like Chet Atkins, they played with fingers or a pick. Then I listened to a certain amount of light classical guitar playing. And of course later on, when the first wave of rock 'n' roll kind of fell away, folk music was very popular and very influential in my style. So it was really less of a choice than what I fell into. I use a pick occasionally. I certainly use it more in the studio when you want to get a certain tone. But it's just the way I came up. I wasn't taught. I just sort of figured things out on my own terms. I guess that was one of the ways that I became comfortable and it just kind of set in.

In popular culture
Buckingham has been portrayed by Bill Hader in a recurring sketch titled "What Up with That?" on NBC's Saturday Night Live. The show features Hader as Buckingham, who repeatedly appears as a guest on a talk show in the sketch; however, the segment always runs out of time before he can be interviewed. Buckingham has stated he does not understand the parody, though he considers it a compliment, and he eventually appeared as himself on the May 14, 2011, episode during this sketch, offering to explain why there were two Lindsey Buckinghams.

Buckingham plays himself and sings in episode 3 of the Showtime series Roadies''.

Discography

Studio albums

Live albums

Compilation albums

Singles

Soundtrack appearances

Other credits

Music videos 

1981 – "Trouble"
1981 – "It Was I"
1983 – "Holiday Road"
1984 – "Go Insane"
1984 – "Slow Dancing"
1992 – "Countdown"
1992 – "Wrong"
1992 – "Soul Drifter"
1993 – "Don't Look Down"
2006 – "Show You How"
2006 – "It Was You"
2006 – "Shut Us Down"
2011 – "Stars Are Crazy" (performance clip)
2011 – "In Our Own Time" (performance clip)

References

External links

 Another interview about his playing
 Official website
 Fleetwood Mac official website
 Kingston Trio & Friends Reunion featuring Lindsey Buckingham
 
 
 
 

 
1949 births
Living people
American male guitarists
American male singer-songwriters
American multi-instrumentalists
American rock guitarists
American rock singers
American rock songwriters
Asylum Records artists
Columbia Records artists
Elektra Records artists
Fingerstyle guitarists
Fleetwood Mac members
Grammy Award winners
Guitarists from California
Lead guitarists
Mercury Records artists
Musicians from Palo Alto, California
People from Atherton, California
People with epilepsy
Polydor Records artists
Record producers from California
Reprise Records artists
San Jose State University alumni
Singer-songwriters from California
Warner Music Group artists
20th-century American guitarists